
Passing By may refer to:

Books
Passing By, a novel by Maurice Baring (1921)

Music

Albums
Passing By - Songs by Jake Heggie, compilation album by several singers (2010)

Songs
"Passing By", song Richard Crooks 1944, to lyrics by Thomas Ford (1580-1648) 
"Passing By" (Beach Boys song)
"Passing By" (Roy Kim song), 2012
"Passing By", song by Diana Dors	Kluger, Norman Newell 1977
"Passing By", song by John McCormack, tenor, piano accompaniment by Gerald Moore (words Robert Herrick, music E. C. Purcell (1940)
"Passing By", song by The Versatiles, 1958
"Passing By", song by Quicksand (Welsh band)